Iain Laidlaw (born 10 December 1976) is a former professional English footballer who played as a defender for Wimbledon.

Career
Laidlaw represented Wimbledon in the 1995 UEFA Intertoto Cup. He signed for the club that summer but was released in 1997 without making a league appearance.

References

1976 births
Living people
English footballers
Wimbledon F.C. players
Association football central defenders